Potter Heigham railway station was a railway station in Norfolk. It was on the line between Melton Constable and Great Yarmouth. It closed in 1959.
In 2012 still in situ is the platform wall, some of the stations buildings and an old signal being used by Richardson's dry dock. You can trace the old line a good few miles to Stalham.

Disused railway stations in Norfolk
Former Midland and Great Northern Joint Railway stations
Railway stations in Great Britain opened in 1880
Railway stations in Great Britain closed in 1959